Gozinaki ( gozinaq’i) is a traditional Georgian confection made of caramelized nuts, usually walnuts, fried in honey, and served exclusively on New Year's Eve and Christmas. In the western Georgian provinces of Imereti and Racha, it was sometimes called Churchkhela, a name more commonly applied to walnuts sewn onto a string, dipped in thickened white grape juice and dried. In several of Georgia's rural areas, both walnuts and honey used to have sacral associations. According to a long-established tradition, Gozinaki is served at special occasions, and is a mandatory component of New Year's Eve/Christmas celebrations.

See also 
 Brittle (food)
 Sesame seed candy
 Yeot-gangjeong

References

Further reading 
Ani Dekanosidze (December 14, 2007) Gozinaki: Boil Up the Honey for a New Year’s Treat. Georgia Today.

Cuisine of Georgia (country)
Christmas food
Walnut dishes
Nut confections